Logunovium is a genus of moths in the family Erebidae from Afrotropics.

Species
 Logunovium nigricostum (Holland, 1893)
 Logunovium scortillum (Wallengren, 1875)

References
 , 2006: New genera and species of Arctiinae from the Afrotropical fauna (Lepidoptera: Arctiidae). Nachrichten des entomologische Vereins Apollo 27 (3): 139-152.
Natural History Museum Lepidoptera generic names catalog

Spilosomina
Moth genera